XLD may refer to:

 Xylose lysine deoxycholate or XLD agar, a growth medium for bacterial cultures
 The XLD connector, a keyed variant of the XLR connector
 An old Microsoft Excel file format